Novaj is a village in the former municipality of Bogovë in Berat County, Albania. At the 2015 local government reform, it became part of the municipality Skrapar.

Attractions
Novaj has a relic that is considered by local Bektashis to be the footprint of Abbas ibn Ali.

References

Populated places in Skrapar
Villages in Berat County